Ngurrawaana is a medium-sized Aboriginal community, located 100 km south east of Karratha in the Pilbara region of Western Australia, within the Shire of Ashburton.

The Ngurrawaana community is situated in the heart of Yindjibarndi country, providing a central location for the continuing activities associated with the cultural, spiritual and religious maintenance of the significant sites and locations within Yindjibarndi territory.

Native title 

The community is located within the determined Ngarluma/Yindjibarndi (WAD6017/96) native title claim area.

Education 

Children of school age at Ngurrawaana community attend the Ngurrawaana Remote Community School. The school teaches up to twenty children, with the principal and one of the school teachers living on site.

Governance 

The community is managed through its incorporated body, Ngurawaana Group (Aboriginal Corporation), incorporated under the Aboriginal Councils and Associations Act 1976 on 10 March 1982.

Town planning 

Ngurawaana Draft Layout Plan No.1 is not yet endorsed by the community and exists only in draft format.

References

External links 
 http://yindjibarndi.org.au/juluwarlu/index.php?PHPSESSID=4afc42a637abdd0210316ab7174575cb
 Office of the Registrar of Indigenous Corporations
 Native Title Claimant application summary
 http://www.rangelandswa.com.au/files/7/files/pilbara_booklet.pdf

Towns in Western Australia
Aboriginal communities in Pilbara